Spring Valley station is a DART Light Rail and bus station in Richardson, Texas. It is the fourth elevated Red Line station on the DART system, and it is located off Spring Valley Road, just east of US 75 (Central Expressway).

The station provides both bus service and DART light rail service, along with over 400 free parking spaces ("Park and Ride").  In 2008, construction began just east of the station of a combination residential / retail development "Spring Valley Station District", a planned development district within the City of Richardson.

External links
 DART - Spring Valley Station
 Spring Valley Station District

Dallas Area Rapid Transit light rail stations
Richardson, Texas
Railway stations in Dallas County, Texas
Railway stations in the United States opened in 2002